Curvature of a curve may refer to:
 Curvature of plane curves
 Curvature of space curves
 Curvature of curves on surfaces